Vladimir Nikolayev (born 1973) is a Russian politician accused of membership in the Russian Mafia. He was a member of former Russian president Vladimir Putin's governing party United Russia; the mayor of Vladivostok; and the owner of seafood, meat, and timber-processing companies. Nikolayev reached his position as mayor when his opponent for the position "tripped" on a grenade left outside his office, killing him.

The city court of Vladivostok removed Nikolayev from his post as the city's mayor in March 2007. Immediately after the decision was made, Nikolayev gave a press conference, in which he called the case against him a "sheer falsification" and "someone’s paid order". In a press statement, the prosecutor's office of Russian federal subject Primorsky Krai announced, "Vladimir Nikolayev called the criminal case initiated against him by prosecutors as a paid and ordered deal and his speech was broadcast by all local and many federal news agencies. In this respect Primorye’s prosecutor’s office asks the General prosecutor’s office to make a legal assessment of Nikolayev’s remarks concerning the case against him."

Originally, Primorsky Krai launched a criminal investigation against Nikolayev and charged him with embezzlement. It also appealed to the city court, requesting that Nikolayev's duties as city mayor be halted while the investigation was ongoing. Soon after, the city court temporarily dismissed Nikolayev from his office, stating, "Nikolayev should not have the power to influence his subordinates during an investigation carried out against him."

In 2012, he was acquitted.

References

1973 births
Living people
Politicians from Vladivostok
Mayors of places in Russia